Francisco Bizcocho Estévez (born 22 January 1951) is a Spanish retired footballer who played as a right back.

Club career
Born in Coria del Río, Province of Seville, Bizcocho played his entire career with local Real Betis, nine of his 11 professional seasons being spent in La Liga. He made his debut in the competition on 5 September 1971 in a 0–2 away loss against Real Madrid, and finished his first year with 31 appearances (30 as starter) to help the Andalusians to the 13th place.

In 1976–77, Bizcocho played 27 games as Betis finished fifth, and scored the decisive penalty in the final of the Copa del Rey, an 8–7 shootout defeat of Athletic Bilbao. The team suffered relegation in the following campaign, however.

Bizcocho retired from football in June 1982 at the age of 31, with top flight totals of 235 games and two goals.

Honours
Copa del Rey: 1976–77
Segunda División: 1973–74

See also
List of one-club men

References

External links

1951 births
Living people
People from Coria del Río
Sportspeople from the Province of Seville
Spanish footballers
Footballers from Andalusia
Association football defenders
La Liga players
Segunda División players
Tercera División players
Real Betis players
Spain amateur international footballers